Israel Michael Sigal  (born 31 August 1945 in Kiev, Ukrainian SSR) is a  Canadian mathematician specializing in  mathematical physics. He is a professor at the University of Toronto Department of Mathematics.

He was an invited speaker at International Congress of Mathematicians, Kyoto—1990 and in International Congress on Mathematical Physics, Lausanne—1979, W. Berlin—1981, Marselle—1986.

Education
Born in Kiev, Ukrainian SSR, Sigal obtained his bachelor's degree at Gorky University and  his Ph.D. at Tel-Aviv University

Research interests
Partial differential equation of quantum physics,  Quantum mechanics and quantum information theory, Quantum field theory,  Statistical mechanics,  Non-linear equations,  Mathematical biology,  Pattern recognition

Awards
 The Jeffrey-Williams Lectureship, CMS Summer Meeting, 1992.
 John L. Synge Award, 1993.
 Fellow of the Royal Society of Canada, 1993.
 University Professor, 1997.
 Norman Stuart Robertson Chair in Applied Mathematics, 1998.	
 CRM-Fields-PIMS prize, 2000.
 Fellow of the American Mathematical Society, 2012.

Selected works

with Volker Bach, Jürg Fröhlich: 
with Peter D. Hislop: 
with F. Ting: 
with Stephen J. Gustafson:

References

External links

Living people
Canadian mathematicians
Fellows of the Royal Society of Canada
Fellows of the American Mathematical Society
Scientists from Kyiv
Academic staff of the University of Toronto
Ukrainian emigrants to Canada
1945 births